Molana Muhammad Idrees (شیخ الحدیث مولانا محمد ادریس صاحب), popularly known as Shaikh Idrees (شیخ ادریس صاحب) was born in Turangzai village of Charsadda District of the Khyber Pakhtunkhwa province of Pakistan. He was born in 1961 to Hakeem Maulana Abdul Haq, a well known religious figure in his days and was known by locals as Munazir-e-Islam. His grandfather was Mufti Shahzada a Shaikh-ul-Hadees and graduate of Darul Uloom Deoband.
Molana Idrees is the son in law of Internationally renowned religious leader and Scholar Molana Hassan Jan. He has two sons named Maulana Hafiz Anees Ahmad who is pursuing religious education in Darul Uloom Haqqania, and Dr Muhammad Salman who is getting medical education and is M.B.B.S.

Education
Molana Muhammad Idrees got his education from Jamia Nomania (جامعہ نعمانیہ) in his hometown Utmanzai. For higher religious education (دورہ حدیث) he went to Darul Uloom Haqqania located in Akora Khattak, Khyber Pakhtunkhwa.
Molana Idrees also got contemporary education and has done M.A Arabic and M.A Islamiyat from University of Peshawar with good grades.

Teaching
After getting his education completed, Molana Idrees devoted himself to giving religious education to the youth of the nation. He started teaching at Jamia Nomania for that purpose and is still busy there in teaching and the management of the institute.
Presently he is Shaikh-ul-Hadees (شیخ الحدیث) at Jamia Nomania.

Political career
Molana Muhammad Idrees has also actively participated in the politics of the country. He has been the Amir (امیر) of the popular political party Jamiat Ulema-e-Islam (F) of Charsadda District. Now he is the sarparast-e-alaa (سرپرست اعلیٰ) of the same party in District Charsadda.
Shaikh sahib has also been a member of the provincial assembly of KP (Khyber Pakhtunkhwa) province and Speaker in the same Assembly.
He is the ex chairman of the press committee and ex member of Nifaz-e-Shariat Council (نفاذ شریعت کونسل).

References

1961 births
Living people
North-West Frontier Province MPAs 2002–2007
People from Charsadda District, Pakistan
Jamiat Ulema-e-Islam (F) politicians
Pashtun people
Darul Uloom Haqqania alumni
Deobandis
University of Peshawar alumni
Academic staff of Darul Uloom Haqqania